Ladies of Washington is a 1944 American drama film directed by Louis King and starring Trudy Marshall, Ronald Graham and Anthony Quinn. It concentrates on a group of young women employed by the federal government in wartime Washington D.C., one of whom becomes involved with an enemy agent.

The film's sets were designed by the art directors James Basevi and Leland Fuller.

Cast

 Trudy Marshall as Carol Northrup  
 Ronald Graham as Dr. Hugh Mayberry  
 Anthony Quinn as Michael Romanescue  
 Sheila Ryan as Jerry Dailey  
 Robert Bailey as Dr. Stephen Craig  
 Beverly Whitney as Helen  
 Jackie Paley as Adelaide  
 Carleton G. Young as Federal Investigator  
 John Philliber as Mother Henry  
 Robin Raymond as Vicky O'Reilly  
 Doris Merrick as Susan
 Lela Bliss as Taxi Passenger  
 Barbara Booth as Betty 
 Charles D. Brown as Inspector Saunders
 Lucile Browne as Taxi Passenger  
 Walter Clinton as Waiter  
 Ruby Dandridge as Nellie  
 Jo-Carroll Dennison as Frieda  
 Harry Depp as Mr. Wethering  
 Herbert Evans as Night Club Patron 
 Mary Field as Nurse's Aide  
 Bess Flowers as Woman Seeking Taxi 
 Byron Foulger as Desk Clerk 
 Inna Gest as Dorothy  
 Jody Gilbert as Nurse's Aide  
 Jane Hale as Minor Role  
 Edna Mae Jones as Amy  
 Rosalind Keith as Nurse 
 J. Farrell MacDonald as Night Watchman  
 Bert McClay as Ensign 
 Sue Moore as Taxi Driver  
 George N. Neise as Radio Commentator 
 Lillian Porter as Marjorie  
 Cyril Ring as Crane's Secretary  
 Harry Shannon as Police Lt. Lake  
 Lee Shumway as Police Sgt. Martin 
 Larry Thompson as Federal Agent  
 Robert Tiernan as Clerk 
 Tom Tyler as Federal Agent 
 John Wald as Radio Commentator 
 Nella Walker as Mrs. Crane 
 Pierre Watkin as Dr. John Crane 
 Claire Whitney as Taxi Passenger

References

Bibliography
 Rowan, Terry. World War II Goes to the Movies & Television Guide: Volume II.

External links
 

1944 films
1940s spy drama films
American spy drama films
Films directed by Louis King
20th Century Fox films
Films scored by Cyril J. Mockridge
Films set in Washington, D.C.
Films set on the home front during World War II
Films with screenplays by Wanda Tuchock
World War II spy films
American black-and-white films
1944 drama films
1940s English-language films
1940s American films